The Battle of Gurdas Nangal was a battle that took place in April 1715 between the Sikhs, led by Banda Singh Bahadur, and the Mughal empire, led by Abd al-Samad Khan. Banda at that time was carrying out operations and small raids to the north of Amritsar. During these operations, the Mughal Army confronted the Sikhs. When confronted, the Sikhs quickly retired northwards to take shelter in the fort of Gurdaspur. It had been recently extended to accommodate 60,000 horses and food. Large stores of grain and fodder had also been collected there. The Mughal Army converged upon the fort from three sides. The Delhi force of 20,000 men under Qamar-ud-din Khan advanced from the east. The Governor of Lahore troops consisting of 10,000 men under Abd al-Samad Khan marched from the south. And the Jammu troops numbering nearly 5,000, under Zakariya Khan, moved from the north. To the west of the fort was the River Ravi, which had no bridge over it. All the boats had been withdrawn to the opposite bank which was closely guarded by numerous local chiefs and government officials. The pursuit made it so the Sikhs could not enter the fort at Gurdaspur. Thus, the army quickly turned west.

Due to all escape paths being barred, Banda Bahadur and his army rushed into the haveli of Duni Chand which had a large open compound with a wall around it at village Gurdas Nangal, 6 km to the west of Gurdaspur. In it, Banda accommodated 1,250 men with a small number of horses.

The Sikhs dug a ditch around the enclosure and filled it with water from the canal flowing nearby. The Mughals also dug trenches all around the enclosure. The battle then took place at the beginning of April 1715. The news of the battle reached Farrukhsiyar on 17 April 1715. The siege lasted a little over eight months. The full summer from April to June, the entire rainy season from July to September, and half of winter from October to the beginning of December passed in this condition with frequent sorties and occasional skirmishes.

Muhammad Qasim, a Mughal soldier who fought against the Sikhs, in this campaign wrote: The brave and daring deeds of the infernal Sikhs was wonderful. Twice or thrice everyday some forty or fifty of the black-faced Sikhs came out of their enclosure to gather grass for their cattle, and, when the combined forces of the Mughals went to oppose them, they made an end of the Mughals with arrows, muskets and small swords, and disappeared. Such was the terror of the Sikhs and the fear of the sorceries of the Sikh Chief that the commanders of this army prayed that God might so ordain things that Banda should seek his safety in flight from the Garhi.Eventually all supplies of foodstuff and fodder dwindled. All animals perished, and their flesh was eaten. Then their bones and bark of trees were powdered and eaten. Many Sikhs died of hunger and the rest were completely famished and reduced to skeletons. Seeing that resistance had completely ceased, the Mughal Army on 7 December 1715, ventured into the enclosure. About 300 Sikh men, almost on the verge of death, were beheaded. Their bodies were then cut up in search of gold coins which the Mughal army believed that they had swallowed. Banda was then, along with his 740 followers, captured and taken to Delhi for execution.

References

Gurdas Nangal
Gurdas Nangal
1715 in Asia
Gurdas Nangal